The 2012 Phillip Island Superbike World Championship round was the first round of the 2012 Superbike World Championship season and of the 2012 Supersport World Championship season. It took place over the weekend of 24–26 February 2012 at the Phillip Island Grand Prix Circuit near Cowes, Victoria, Australia.

Superbike
Crescent Suzuki's John Hopkins and Team Pedercini's Leandro Mercado, both injured, were replaced by Josh Brookes and Bryan Staring.

During Saturday sessions, a crash in the domestic Supersport race killed Oscar McIntyre, 17, and the circuit was closed for investigation following the fatal crash. The incident forced officials to call off Superpole qualifying, as the investigation curtailed all events at the circuit for the day. The starting grid for both races was then established from the two qualifying sessions.

Max Biaggi won the first race with 7.104 secs advantage over Marco Melandri while Carlos Checa lost the rear tire when he was accelerating into the main straight of the circuit. In terms of top speed, both Biaggi and Melandri recorded the highest top speeds of 324.6 and 322.7 km/h respectively. Melandri's result represented the first ever second position for BMW at a superbike race. Phillip Island second race was full of drama when Biaggi went off the track and re-joined in the last position. He remounted all the way to finish second at just +5.707 secs from race winner Checa.

Race 1 classification

Race 2 classification

Supersport

Race classification

References

External links
 The official website of the Superbike World Championship

Motorsport at Phillip Island
Superbike World Championship
Phillip Island